Ha Jun-ho (Hangul: 하준호; born April 29, 1989 in Busan) is a South Korean pitcher for the KT Wiz in the Korea Baseball Organization (KBO). He previously played in KBO for the Lotte Giants.

References 

KT Wiz players
Lotte Giants players
KBO League pitchers
South Korean baseball players
1989 births
Living people
Sportspeople from Busan